Picea parsonsii may refer to:

Picea parsonsii Fowler, 1872, a synonym of Abies concolor
Picea parsonsii Gordon, 1862, a synonym of Abies grandis